II is the second album by American rock supergroup Last in Line. It was released on February 22, 2019, and produced by bass player Jeff Pilson with the band. The first single, "Landslide" was released on November 28, 2018.

For this album, bass player Phil Soussan (ex-Ozzy Osbourne) replaced Jimmy Bain after his death at the age of 68 on January 23, 2016.

Track listing
All songs written by Andrew Freeman, Vivian Campbell, Phil Soussan and Vinny Appice.

Personnel
Last in Line
 Andrew Freeman - vocals, piano, producing, recording, mixing
 Vivian Campbell - guitar, producing
 Phil Soussan - bass guitar, keyboards, backing vocals, producing, mixing, mastering (track 13)
 Vinny Appice - drums, producing
Additional personnel
 Jacob Freeman - backing vocals
 Sarah Hester Ross - backing vocals
 Jeff Pilson - mellotron, backing vocals, producing, recording
 Chris Collier - recording, mastering, mixing

References

2019 albums
Last in Line albums
Frontiers Records albums
Albums produced by Jeff Pilson